Quarters A, B, and C, Norfolk Naval Shipyard are three historic officer's quarters located at the Norfolk Naval Shipyard in Portsmouth, Virginia. They were built about 1837, and are three Greek Revival style brick dwellings.  Quarters A is the most formal and sits on a high basement and covered by a hipped roof with interior end chimneys. It features a central entry with Doric order pilasters, plain full entablature and blocking course. Its design is taken directly from Plate 28 of Asher Benjamin's The Practical House Carpenter (1830). Quarters B and C also sit on a high basement and covered by a hipped roof with interior end chimneys.

Quarters A, the residence of the shipyard's commanders,  was extensively damaged by fire on 12 August 2014.

The residences were listed on the National Register of Historic Places in 1974.

References

Houses on the National Register of Historic Places in Virginia
Greek Revival houses in Virginia
Houses completed in 1837
Houses in Portsmouth, Virginia
National Register of Historic Places in Portsmouth, Virginia